New Zealand sent a delegation to take part in the 2010 Winter Paralympics in Vancouver, British Columbia, Canada. The country fielded two athletes, both in alpine skiing.

The country was also represented by four officials - a chef de mission, a coach, an assistant coach and a physiotherapist.

Medallists

Alpine skiing 

Adam Hall, who has spina bifida and who previously represented New Zealand at the 2006 Winter Paralympics, will compete in the Slalom and Giant Slalom.

Peter Williams, who also has spina bifida and will be making his Paralympic Games début, will compete in the Slalom, Giant Slalom and Super G. Unlike his compatriot, he will be using a monoski.

See also
New Zealand at the Paralympics
New Zealand at the 2010 Winter Olympics
New Zealand at the 2006 Winter Paralympics

Notes and references

External links
Vancouver 2010 Paralympic Games official website
International Paralympic Committee official website

Nations at the 2010 Winter Paralympics
2010
Paralympics